The Angarsk State Technical Academy (AGTA, rus. Ангарская Государственная Техническая Академия -  АГТА]) is the center of education, science, and culture for the city of Angarsk and Angarsk regional area. Founder of AGTA is the Government of the Russian Federation. The right to conduct educational activity in the field of the higher, postgraduate education is fixed by the license #64670, registration #4571, beginning from the month of April, 18th day, 2005 year, awarded by the Russian Federal Agency of Education (Rosobrazovanie).

Primary goals of AGTА
 Satisfy demands of the individuals in intellectual, cultural and moral development, by the means of the graduate and post-graduate education;
 Satisfactions of the society's demand in the qualified experts with higher education and scientific, as well as pedagogical human resources with the highest possible qualifications;
 The organization and execution of fundamental, applied science, scientific, and technical research;
 Spread of knowledge among the population and increase of its outlook, as well as provide additional educational and other services to the residents of Angarsk city and the Eastern Siberian region.

Foundation
Angarsk – a city born of the Victory. The construction on the bank of Angara River began after the World War II ended. Large and powerful industrial complex was developed. This was the main cause of the big demand for the engineering corps. There was a necessity for a higher technical educational institution. So, in 1952-53 school year, on the basis of Angarsk Industrial Technical Vocational School, a nationwide distance learning polytechnical institute was created.  This served as the foundation for the AGTA.

Mailing Address
665835, Angarsk, Irkutsk region
Tchaikovsky street, 60.

Accompanying references
Agency of the Russian Federation by training
Angarsk Municipal Education
Irkutsk Region Administration

References
Translated from Russian on 28 Apr 2010 from AGTA General Information Web site.

Universities in Irkutsk Oblast
Technical universities and colleges in Russia